The St. Anthony of Padua Catholic Church is a historic church in Hoven, South Dakota. It is part of the Roman Catholic Diocese of Sioux Falls. Built in 1920–1921, It was added to the National Register of Historic Places in 1980 as the St. Bernard's Catholic Church.

It is a brick Neo-Romanesque-Gothic building with an ornate portal entrance surmounted by a rose window.  It has two  towers.

References

Churches in the Roman Catholic Diocese of Sioux Falls
Churches on the National Register of Historic Places in South Dakota
Roman Catholic churches completed in 1921
Buildings and structures in Potter County, South Dakota
National Register of Historic Places in Potter County, South Dakota
20th-century Roman Catholic church buildings in the United States